The Tin and Sheet Millmen's Association was a trade union representing millmen in the metalworking industry in the United Kingdom.

History
The union was founded in 1899 following the collapse of the Independent Association of Tinplate Makers.  In contrast to the earlier union, it did not represent tinhousemen, but it nonetheless immediately recruited more than 1,000 members.  These included members of the South Wales, Monmouth and Gloucester Tinplate Workers' Union which merged into the new organisation, its secretary Thomas Philips becoming president of the Tin and Sheet Millmen.

The British Steel Smelters Association repeatedly asked the Millmen to merge with it, but demarcation disputes led to distrust between the two, and this was only partly improved with the formation of the loose Iron and Steel Trades Federation in 1913.  The union balloted its members on a possible merger into the new British Iron, Steel and Kindred Trades Association, but this was rejected.  However, in 1921, the union did merge into it.

Election results
The union affiliated to the Labour Party, and sponsored its general secretary as a candidate in the 1918 UK general election.

General Secretaries
1899: Thomas Philips
1904: Ivor Gwynne

Presidents
1899: Ivor Gwynne
1906: M. Griffiths

References

Defunct trade unions of the United Kingdom
Organizations disestablished in 1917
1899 establishments in the United Kingdom
Iron and Steel Trades Confederation amalgamations
Trade unions established in 1899
Steel industry trade unions of the United Kingdom
Trade unions in Wales